William Fulton Walker (1888–1974) was a Scottish amateur footballer who played as a centre forward in the Scottish League for Queen's Park.

Personal life 
Walker's brothers Jim and Frank were also Queen's Park footballers. Prior to the First World War, Walker worked for the Todd & Walker law firm in Paisley. During the war, he served as a second lieutenant in the Argyll and Sutherland Highlanders and was wounded in May 1917.

Career statistics

References

1888 births
Date of birth missing
1974 deaths
Date of death missing
Scottish footballers
Footballers from Paisley, Renfrewshire
Scottish Football League players
British Army personnel of World War I
Association football forwards
Queen's Park F.C. players
Argyll and Sutherland Highlanders officers